The 970s BC is a decade which lasted from 979 BC to 970 BC.

Events and trends
Possible date of the death of King David.

Significant people
 King Zhao of Zhou (reign 977/75-957) fourth king of the Chinese Zhou dynasty ascended the throne.
 Shoshenq I, pharaoh of Egypt. is born (approximate date); "Shishak" of 1 Kings 14:25.

References 

 

 

es:Años 970 a. C.